Humboldt's squirrel monkey (Saimiri cassiquiarensis) is a species of squirrel monkey from Brazil, Colombia, Ecuador, Peru and Venezuela. It had previously been considered a subspecies of the common squirrel monkey, S. scuireus, but was elevated to full species status based on a genetic study by Carretero-Pinzón in 2009. A genetic study by Jessica Lynch Alfaro, et al indicated that the Ecuadorian squirrel monkey may be synonymous with Saimiri cassiquiarensis.  As of 2018, the Ecuadorian squirrel monkey is generally regarded as a subspecies of Humboldt's squirrel monkey, S. cassiquiarensis macrodon.

Its coloration is similar to that of the Guianan squirrel monkey but the fur on the base of the crown is golden yellow as compared with gray for the Guianan squirrel monkey. It eats fruits when available, primarily between January and June, and also eats insects.

References

Squirrel monkeys
Mammals described in 1840
Primates of South America
Mammals of Ecuador
Mammals of Colombia
Mammals of Peru
Mammals of Brazil
Mammals of Venezuela
Taxa named by René Lesson